Øyarvatnet or Øyarvatn is a lake in Agder county, Norway. The lake is part of the Kvina river system. It is located just to the south of the lake Rosskreppfjorden, which flows into it.

See also
List of lakes in Aust-Agder
List of lakes in Norway

References

Lakes of Agder
Valle, Norway
Sirdal